Anhui Conch Cement Co., Ltd. known also as Anhui Conch or Conch Cement, is the largest  cement manufacturer or seller in the mainland China, headquartered in Anhui Province. Its business scope covers the manufacture and sales of cement and clinker.

Its H-share was listed in the Hong Kong Stock Exchange on October 21, 1997, while its A-share was listed in the Shanghai Stock Exchange on February 7, 2002.

Shareholders
The largest shareholder of Conch Cement was Anhui Conch Holdings, which was owned by  via wholly owned subsidiary Anhui Provincial Investment Group Holdings Co., Ltd. and subsidiary China Conch Venture Holdings. The second largest shareholder, Conch Venture Investment is owned by trade unions and other private shareholders.

References

External links
Anhui Conch Cement Company Limited

1997 establishments in China
Cement companies of China
Companies listed on the Hong Kong Stock Exchange
Companies listed on the Shanghai Stock Exchange
Companies in the CSI 100 Index
Companies owned by the provincial government of China
Companies based in Wuhu
Companies established in 1997
Chinese brands
H shares